Leonard Frank Watson (11 October 1927 – 5 August 2013) was a New Zealand cricketer. He played three first-class matches for Otago between 1953 and 1954.

See also
 List of Otago representative cricketers

References

External links
 

1927 births
2013 deaths
New Zealand cricketers
Otago cricketers
Cricketers from Dunedin